Acacia hystrix is a shrub belonging to the genus Acacia and the subgenus Phyllodineae that is endemic to south western Australia.

Description
The glabrous branchlets with inconspicuous, caducous stipules. Like most species of Acacia it has phyllodes rather than true leaves. The erect phyllodes are often running almost continuously with branchlets. The simple inflorescences are found in pairs in the axils with spherical flower-heads containing 10 to 13 bright light golden flowers. Following flowering firmly chartaceous to thinly coriaceous seed pods form that have an oblong to narrowly oblong shape. The seeds inside are arranged longitudinally to obliquely.

Taxonomy
The species was first formally described by the botanist Bruce Maslin in 1999 as part of the work Acacia miscellany 16. The taxonomy of fifty-five species of Acacia, primarily Western Australian, in section Phyllodineae as published in the journal Nuytsia. It was reclassified as Racosperma hystrix by Leslie Pedley in 2003 then transferred back to genus Acacia in 2006.

There are two recognised subspecies:
 Acacia hystrix subsp. continua Acacia hystrix subsp. hystrix''

Distribution
It is native to an area in the Wheatbelt and Goldfields-Esperance regions of Western Australia where it is found growing in sandy or loamy soils. It is found from around Kulin in the west to around Lake Gilmore in the east.

See also
List of Acacia species

References

hystrix
Acacias of Western Australia
Taxa named by Bruce Maslin
Plants described in 1999